The Percival Merganser was a light, civil transport of the late 1940s. It was a twin-engine, high-wing monoplane of all-metal, stressed skin construction with retractable tricycle undercarriage.

Design and development
The Merganser was designed as a five-passenger, light airliner with an emphasis on "passenger appeal". To this end, a high-wing configuration and tricycle landing gear were chosen to provide the best view and a low, level floor for easy access.

The fuselage, having been completed in November 1946, was shipped by train ferry to Paris to be displayed at the Aero Show. By this time, the Merganser was already doomed, since it was designed to be powered by de Havilland Gipsy Queen 51 engines and neither these nor any suitable substitute were available.

Operational history
Only one Merganser was flown; when it made its first flight on 9 May 1947 from Luton Airport, the engines were on loan from the Ministry of Supply. The company was able to carry out extensive flight trials and obtain much valuable data. Although it appeared at the SBAC Show at Radlett in September 1947, it was scrapped at Luton in August 1948.

A second Merganser was used as a static and structural test airframe.

Although the Merganser never entered production, further development, based on the data gathered from its test programme, would lead to the larger Prince, President and Pembroke series for which a suitable powerplant was available.

Variants
P.48 Merganser
Five to eight-seat transport, one completed and two fuselages.
P.48A Merganser
Proposed floatplane variant, not built.
P.48B Merganser
Proposed ski-plane variant, not built.
P.49 Merganser II
Proposed aerial survey variant, not built.

Specifications (Merganser)

See also

References

Notes

Bibliography

 Jackson, A.J. British Civil Aircraft 1919-1972: Volume III. London: Putnam, 1988. .

External links 
 G-AHMH Percival P.48 Merganser (c/n AU.1)
  "It Packs A Load," Popular Science September 1947

Merganser
1940s British civil utility aircraft
High-wing aircraft
Aircraft first flown in 1947
Twin piston-engined tractor aircraft